Charles Winter Wood (December 17, 1869 – June 9, 1953) was an American educator and actor who graduated from Beloit College in Beloit, WI. He was the second head football coach at Tuskegee University in Tuskegee, Alabama and he held that position for four seasons, from 1897 until 1901.  His coaching record at Tuskegee was 1–3. Wood spent 30 years at the Tuskegee Institute in the English and Drama departments. He was also an actor.

Wood died in 1953 at a hospital Queens, New York of an illness.

References

1869 births
1953 deaths
Tuskegee Golden Tigers football coaches
Tuskegee University faculty
Sportspeople from Nashville, Tennessee

Beloit College alumni